Camellia (pronounced  or ) is a genus of flowering plants in the family Theaceae. They are found in tropical and subtropical areas in eastern and southern Asia, from the Himalayas east to Japan and Indonesia. There are more than 220 described species. Camellias are popular ornamental, tea and woody-oil plants that have been cultivated throughout the world for centuries. To date, over 26,000 cultivars, with more than 51,000 cultivar names including synonyms, have been registered or published.

Of economic importance in East Asia, Southeast Asia, and the Indian subcontinent, leaves of C. sinensis are processed to create the popular beverage tea. The ornamental C. japonica, C. sasanqua and their hybrids are the source of hundreds of garden cultivars. C. oleifera produces tea seed oil, used in cooking and cosmetics.

Taxonomy 
The genus was named by Linnaeus after the Jesuit botanist Georg Joseph Kamel, who worked in the Philippines and described one of its species (although Linnaeus did not refer to Kamel's account when discussing the genus).

Botany 

Their leaves are alternately arranged, simple, thick, serrated, and usually glossy.

Flowers and fruit 
Their flowers are usually large and conspicuous, one to 12 cm in diameter, with five to nine petals in naturally occurring species of camellias. The colors of the flowers vary from white through pink colors to red; truly yellow flowers are found only in South China and Vietnam. Tea varieties are always white-flowered. Camellia flowers throughout the genus are characterized by a dense bouquet of conspicuous yellow stamens, often contrasting with the petal colors.

The fruit of camellia plants is a dry capsule, sometimes subdivided in up to five compartments, each compartment containing up to eight seeds.

Growth 
The various species of camellia plants are generally well-adapted to acid soils rich in humus, and most species do not grow well on chalky soil or other calcium-rich soils. Most species of camellias also require a large amount of water, either from natural rainfall or from irrigation, and the plants will not tolerate droughts. However, some of the more unusual camellias – typically species from karst soils in Vietnam – can grow without too much water.

Camellia plants usually have a rapid growth rate. Typically they will grow about 30 cm per year until mature – though this does vary depending on their variety and geographical location.

Ecology 
Camellia plants are used as food plants by the larvae of a number of Lepidoptera species. Leaves of Camellia japonica are susceptible to the fungal parasite Mycelia sterile (see below for the significance), mycelia sterile PF1022 produces a metabolite named PF1022A that is used to produce emodepside, an anthelmintic drug.

Mainly due to habitat destruction, several camellias have become quite rare in their natural range. One of these is the aforementioned C. reticulata, grown commercially in thousands for horticulture and oil production, but rare enough in its natural range to be considered a threatened species.

Use by humans 

Camellia sinensis, the tea plant, is of major commercial importance because tea is made from its leaves. The species C. sinensis is the product of many generations of selective breeding in order to bring out qualities considered desirable for tea. However, many other camellias can be used to produce a similar beverage. For example, in some parts of Japan, tea made from C. sasanqua leaves is popular.

Tea oil is a sweet seasoning and cooking oil made by pressing the seeds of C. oleifera, C. japonica, and to a lesser extent other species such as C. crapnelliana, C. reticulata, C. sasanqua and C. sinensis. Relatively little-known outside East Asia, it is the most important cooking oil for hundreds of millions of people, particularly in southern China.

Camellia oil is commonly used to clean and protect the blades of cutting instruments.

Camellia oil pressed from seeds of C. japonica, also called tsubaki oil or tsubaki-abura (椿油) in Japanese, has been traditionally used in Japan for hair care. C. japonica plant is used to prepare traditional antiinflammatory medicines.

History

Fossil record 
The earliest fossil record of Camellia are the leaves of †C. abensis from the upper Eocene
of Japan, †C. abchasica from the lower Oligocene of Bulgaria and
†C. multiforma from the lower Oligocene of Washington, United States.

Garden history 
Camellias were cultivated in the gardens of China and Japan for centuries before they were seen in Europe. The German botanist Engelbert Kaempfer reported that the "Japan Rose", as he called it, grew wild in woodland and hedgerow, but that many superior varieties had been selected for gardens. He was told that the plant had 900 names in Japanese. Europeans' earliest views of camellias must have been their representations in Chinese painted wallpapers, where they were often represented growing in porcelain pots.

The first living camellias seen in England were a single red and a single white, grown and flowered in his garden at Thorndon Hall, Essex, by Robert James, Lord Petre, among the keenest gardeners of his generation, in 1739. His gardener James Gordon was the first to introduce camellias to commerce, from the nurseries he established after Lord Petre's untimely death in 1743, at Mile End, Essex, near London.

With the expansion of the tea trade in the later 18th century, new varieties began to be seen in England, imported through the British East India Company. The Company's John Slater was responsible for the first of the new camellias, double ones, in white and a striped red, imported in 1792. Further camellias imported in the East Indiamen were associated with the patrons whose gardeners grew them:  a double red for Sir Robert Preston in 1794 and the pale pink named "Lady Hume's Blush" for Amelia, the lady of Sir Abraham Hume of Wormleybury, Hertfordshire (1806).  The camellia was imported from England to America in 1797 when Colonel John Stevens brought the flower as part of an effort to grow attractions within Elysian Fields in Hoboken, New Jersey.  By 1819, twenty-five camellias had bloomed in England; that year the first monograph appeared, Samuel Curtis's, A Monograph on the Genus Camellia, whose five handsome folio colored illustrations have usually been removed from the slender text and framed. Camellias that set seed, though they did not flower for more than a decade, rewarded their growers with a wealth of new varieties. By the 1840s, the camellia was at the height of its fashion as the luxury flower. The Parisian courtesan Marie Duplessis, who died young in 1847, inspired Dumas' La Dame aux camélias and Verdi's La Traviata.

The fashionable imbricated formality of prized camellias was an element in their decline, replaced by the new hothouse orchid. Their revival after World War I as woodland shrubs for mild climates has been paralleled by the rise in popularity of Camellia sasanqua.

Modern cultivars
The tea camellia, C. sinensis, has many commercial cultivars selected for the taste of their leaves once processed into tea leaves.

Today camellias are grown as ornamental plants for their flowers; about 3,000 cultivars and hybrids have been selected, many with double or semi-double flowers. C. japonica is the most prominent species in cultivation, with over 2,000 named cultivars. Next are C. reticulata with over 400 named cultivars, and C. sasanqua with over 300 named cultivars. Popular hybrids include C. × hiemalis (C. japonica × C. sasanqua) and C. × williamsii (C. japonica × C. saluenensis). They are frequently planted in woodland settings, alongside other calcifuges such as rhododendrons, and are particularly associated with areas of high soil acidity, such as Cornwall and Devon in the UK. They are highly valued for their very early flowering, often among the first flowers to appear in the late winter. Late frosts can damage the flower buds, resulting in misshapen flowers.

There is great variety of flower forms:

 single (flat, bowl- or cup-shaped)
 semi-double (rows of large outer petals, with the centre comprising mixed petals and stamens)
 double:
 paeony form (convex mass of irregular petals and petaloids with hidden stamens)
 anemone form (one or more rows of outer petals, with mixed petaloids and stamens in the centre)
 rose form (overlapping petals showing stamens in a concave centre when open)
 formal double (rows of overlapping petals with hidden stamens)

AGM cultivars

The following hybrid cultivars have gained the Royal Horticultural Society's Award of Garden Merit:

Species 

Plants of the World Online currently includes:

 Camellia albata Orel & Curry
 Camellia amplexicaulis (Pit.) Cohen-Stuart
 Camellia amplexifolia Merr. & Chun
 Camellia anlungensis Hung T.Chang
 Camellia assimiloides Sealy
 Camellia aurea Hung T.Chang
 Camellia azalea C.F.Wei
 Camellia brevistyla (Hayata) Cohen-Stuart
 Camellia bugiamapensis Orel, Curry, Luu & Q.D.Nguyen
 Camellia campanulata Orel, Curry & Luu
 Camellia candida Hung T.Chang
 Camellia capitata Orel, Curry & Luu
 Camellia cattienensis Orel
 Camellia caudata Wall.
 Camellia chekiangoleosa Hu
 Camellia cherryana Orel
 Camellia chinmeiae S.L.Lee & T.Y.A.Yang
 Camellia chrysanthoides Hung T.Chang
 Camellia concinna Orel & Curry
 Camellia connata (Craib) Craib
 Camellia corallina (Gagnep.) Sealy
 Camellia cordifolia (F.P.Metcalf) Nakai
 Camellia costata S.Y.Hu & S.Y.Liang
 Camellia costei H.Lév.
 Camellia crapnelliana Tutcher – Crapnell's camellia
 Camellia crassicolumna Hung T.Chang
 Camellia crassipes Sealy
 Camellia crassiphylla Ninh & Hakoda
 Camellia cuongiana Orel & Curry
 Camellia cupiformis T.L.Ming
 Camellia curryana Orel & Luu
 Camellia cuspidata (Kochs) Bean
 Camellia dalatensis V.D.Luong, Ninh & Hakoda
 Camellia debaoensis R.C.Hu & Y.Q.Liufu
 Camellia decora Orel, Curry & Luu
 Camellia dilinhensis Ninh & V.D.Luong
 Camellia dongnaicensis Orel
 Camellia dormoyana (Pierre ex Laness.) Sealy
 Camellia drupifera Lour.
 Camellia duyana Orel, Curry & Luu
 Camellia edithae Hance
 Camellia elizabethae Orel & Curry
 Camellia elongata (Rehder & E.H.Wilson) Rehder
 Camellia erubescens Orel & Curry
 Camellia euphlebia Merr. ex Sealy
 Camellia euryoides Lindl.
 Camellia fangchengensis S.Ye Liang & Y.C.Zhong
 Camellia fansipanensis J.M.H.Shaw, Wynn-Jones & V.D.Nguyen
 Camellia fascicularis Hung T.Chang
 Camellia flava (Pit.) Sealy
 Camellia flavida Hung T.Chang
 Camellia fleuryi (A.Chev.) Sealy
 Camellia fluviatilis Hand.-Mazz.
 Camellia forrestii (Diels) Cohen-Stuart
 Camellia fraterna Hance
 Camellia furfuracea (Merr.) Cohen-Stuart
 Camellia gaudichaudii (Gagnep.) Sealy
 Camellia gilbertii (A.Chev.) Sealy
 Camellia glabricostata T.L.Ming
 Camellia gracilipes Merr. ex Sealy
 Camellia grandibracteata Hung T.Chang, Y.J.Tan, F.L.Yu & P.S.Wang
 Camellia granthamiana Sealy – Grantham's camellia
 Camellia grijsii Hance
 Camellia gymnogyna Hung T.Chang
 Camellia harlandii Orel & Curry
 Camellia hatinhensis V.D.Luong, Ninh & L.T.Nguyen
 Camellia hekouensis C.J.Wang & G.S.Fan
 Camellia hiemalis Nakai
 Camellia honbaensis Luu, Q.D.Nguyen & G.Tran
 Camellia hongiaoensis Orel & Curry
 Camellia hongkongensis Seem.
 Camellia hsinpeiensis S.S.Ying
 Camellia huana T.L.Ming & W.J.Zhang
 Camellia ilicifolia Y.K.Li
 Camellia impressinervis Hung T.Chang & S.Ye Liang
 Camellia indochinensis Merr.
 Camellia ingens Orel & Curry
 Camellia insularis Orel & Curry
 Camellia × intermedia (Tuyama) Nagam.
 Camellia inusitata Orel, Curry & Luu
 Camellia japonica L. – East Asian camelliasynonym Camellia rusticana – snow camellia
 Camellia kissii Wall.
 Camellia krempfii (Gagnep.) Sealy
 Camellia kwangsiensis Hung T.Chang
 Camellia lanceolata (Blume) Seem.
 Camellia langbianensis (Gagnep.) P.H.Hô
 Camellia laotica (Gagnep.) T.L.Ming
 Camellia lawii Sealy
 Camellia leptophylla S.Ye Liang ex Hung T.Chang
 Camellia ligustrina Orel, Curry & Luu
 Camellia longicalyx Hung T.Chang
 Camellia longii Orel & Luu
 Camellia longipedicellata (Hu) Hung T.Chang & D.Fang
 Camellia longissima Hung T.Chang & S.Ye Liang
 Camellia lucii Orel & Curry
 Camellia lutchuensis T.Itô
 Camellia luteocerata Orel
 Camellia luteoflora Y.K.Li ex Hung T.Chang & F.A.Zeng
 Camellia luteopallida V.D.Luong, T.Q.T.Nguyen & Luu
 Camellia luuana Orel & Curry
 Camellia maiana Orel
 Camellia mairei (H.Lév.) Melch.
 Camellia maoniushanensis J.L.Liu & Q.Luo
 Camellia megasepala Hung T.Chang & Trin Ninh
 Camellia melliana Hand.-Mazz.
 Camellia micrantha S.Ye Liang & Y.C.Zhong
 Camellia mileensis T.L.Ming
 Camellia mingii S.X.Yang
 Camellia minima Orel & Curry
 Camellia mollis Hung T.Chang & S.X.Ren
 Camellia montana (Blanco) Hung T.Chang & S.X.Ren
 Camellia murauchii Ninh & Hakoda
 Camellia namkadingensis Soulad. & Tagane
 Camellia nematodea (Gagnep.) Sealy
 Camellia nervosa (Gagnep.) Hung T.Chang
 Camellia oconoriana Orel, Curry & Luu
 Camellia oleifera C.Abel – oil-seed camellia, tea oil camellia
 Camellia pachyandra Hu
 Camellia parviflora Merr. & Chun ex Sealy
 Camellia parvimuricata Hung T.Chang
 Camellia paucipunctata (Merr. & Chun) Chun
 Camellia petelotii (Merr.) Sealy synonyms:C. chrysantha, C. nitidissima – yellow camellia
 Camellia philippinensis Hung T.Chang & S.X.Ren
 Camellia pilosperma S.Yun Liang
 Camellia pingguoensis D.Fang
 Camellia piquetiana (Pierre) Sealy
 Camellia pitardii Cohen-Stuart
 Camellia pleurocarpa (Gagnep.) Sealy
 Camellia polyodonta F.C.How ex Hu
 Camellia psilocarpa X.G.Shi & C.X.Ye
 Camellia ptilophylla Hung T.Chang
 Camellia pubicosta Merr.
 Camellia pubifurfuracea Y.C.Zhong
 Camellia pubipetala Y.Wan & S.Z.Huang
 Camellia pukhangensis N.D.Do, V.D.Luong, S.T.Hoang & T.H.Lê
 Camellia punctata (Kochs) Cohen-Stuart
 Camellia pyriparva Orel & Curry
 Camellia pyxidiacea Z.R.Xu, F.P.Chen & C.Y.Deng
 Camellia quangcuongii L.V.Dung, S.T. Hoang & Nhan
 Camellia reflexa Orel & Curry
 Camellia renshanxiangiae C.X.Ye & X.Q.Zheng
 Camellia reticulata Lindl.
 Camellia rhytidocarpa Hung T.Chang & S.Ye Liang
 Camellia rosacea Tagane, Soulad. & Yahara
 Camellia rosiflora Hook.
 Camellia rosmannii Ninh
 Camellia rosthorniana Hand.-Mazz.
 Camellia rubriflora Ninh & Hakoda
 Camellia salicifolia Champ.
 Camellia saluenensis Stapf ex Bean
 Camellia sasanqua Thunb.
 Camellia scabrosa Orel & Curry
 Camellia sealyana T.L.Ming
 Camellia semiserrata C.W.Chi
 Camellia septempetala Hung T.Chang & L.L.Qi
 Camellia siangensis T.K.Paul & M.P.Nayar
 Camellia sinensis (L.) Kuntze – tea plant
 Camellia sonthaiensis Luu, V.D.Luong, Q.D.Nguyen & T.Q.T.Nguyen
 Camellia stuartiana Sealy
 Camellia subintegra P.C.Huang
 Camellia synaptica Sealy
 Camellia szechuanensis C.W.Chi
 Camellia szemaoensis Hung T.Chang
 Camellia tachangensis F.S.Zhang
 Camellia tadungensis Orel, Curry & Luu
 Camellia taliensis (W.W.Sm.) Melch. – also used to make tea like C. sinensis
 Camellia tenii Sealy
 Camellia thailandica Hung T.Chang & S.X.Ren
 Camellia thanxaensa Hakoda & Kirino
 Camellia tienyenensis Orel & Curry
 Camellia tomentosa Orel & Curry
 Camellia tonkinensis (Pit.) Cohen-Stuart
 Camellia transarisanensis (Hayata) Cohen-Stuart
 Camellia trichoclada (Rehder) S.S.Chien
 Camellia tsaii Hu
 Camellia tsingpienensis Hu
 Camellia tuberculata S.S.Chien
 Camellia tuyenquangensis V.D.Luong, Le & Ninh
 Camellia uraku Kitam.
 Camellia villicarpa S.S.Chien
 Camellia viridicalyx Hung T.Chang & S.Ye Liang
 Camellia viscosa Orel & Curry
 Camellia vuquangensis V.D.Luong, Ninh & L.T.Nguyen
 Camellia wardii Kobuski
 Camellia xanthochroma K.M.Feng & L.S.Xie
 Camellia yokdonensis Dung bis & Hakoda
 Camellia yunkiangica Hung T.Chang, H.S.Wang & B.H.Chen
 Camellia yunnanensis (Pit. ex Diels) Cohen-Stuart

Cultural significance

The Camellia family of plants in popular culture. 
 The following cities are nicknamed the "Camellia City" of each state: Greenville, Alabama; Sacramento, California; Fort Walton Beach, Florida; Slidell, Louisiana; McComb, Mississippi; Newberg, Oregon; and, Thomson, Georgia is nicknamed the "Camellia City of the South".
 The camellia is the state flower of Alabama.
 The Camellia Bowl is a post-season college football game played in Montgomery, Alabama, hosted by the NCAA.
 Alexandre Dumas fils wrote the novel and stage adaptation The Lady of the Camellias, wherein the flower is a symbol of a courtesan's sexual availability. 
 Augusta National Golf Club's 10th hole is named "Camellia", one of many references to the plant nursery originally on the site of the course. 
 Rabindranath Tagore wrote a poem entitled "Camellia" about a youth's longing for a young woman he sees on the train.
 In the book To Kill a Mockingbird, Jem destroys Mrs. Dubose's camellia bushes after she insults his family, yet he later receives a camellia bud from the dying woman.
  A white camellia flower is an iconic symbol of Chanel haute couture, a tradition started by Coco Chanel herself who identified with the heroine of Dumas' work.
 Camellias have major significance in the Akira Kurosawa film Sanjuro, likely due to their association with the concept of "a noble death" in samurai culture.
 White camellias became a symbol of the women's suffrage movement in New Zealand and appears on the country's ten-dollar note.
 The Knights of the White Camelia was an organization similar to the Ku Klux Klan.
 Temple City, California's slogan since 1944 has been "Temple City, Home of Camellias", and the city has become well-known for its Camellia Festival.
 In Brazil, the camellia was a symbol of abolitionist movement during the Imperial Age. It was common practice for abolitionists to plant camellias in a show of solidarity.
 An Argentinian military march is called "Avenida de las Camelias".
 Camellia flowers are featured on the cover of The Silent Circus, the second studio album by American progressive metal band Between the Buried and Me.

See also

 List of Award of Garden Merit camellias

References

Further reading
  (2005): Mechanisms of action of emodepside. Parasitology Research 97(Supplement 1): S1-S10.  (HTML abstract)
  (2009): The True History of Tea.  Thames & Hudson.  .
 F. Camangi, A. Stefani, T. Bracci, A. Minnocci, L. Sebastiani, A. Lippi, G. Cattolica, A.M. Santoro: Antiche camelie della Lucchesia (Storia, Botanico, Cultura, agronomia novità scientifiche e curiosità; Orto Botanico Comunale di Lucca). Edition ETS; Lucca, 2012. Italian.

External links

 The International Camellia Society
 The American Camellia Society
 The Southeastern Camellia Society
 Website with many Camellia illustrations from European and Japanese Camellia Books
 First Public Camellia Show historical marker
 Camellia House, Wollaton Park

 
Ericales genera
Symbols of Alabama